Aaron's rod refers to any of the staffs carried by Moses' brother, Aaron, in the Old Testament of the Bible.

Aaron's rod may also refer to:

 Aaron's Rod (novel), a book by D. H. Lawrence

Plants

Hylotelephium telephium, a plant also known as orpine or live-forever
Solidago, a genus of North American plants with yellow flowers
Thermopsis villosa, a species of North American plant with yellow flowers
Verbascum thapsus, a biennial plant with medicinal uses and tall flowering stems